Pihla Keto-Huovinen (born 19 September 1974 in Espoo) is a Finnish politician currently serving in the Parliament of Finland for the National Coalition Party at the Uusimaa constituency.

References

1974 births
Living people
People from Espoo
National Coalition Party politicians
Members of the Parliament of Finland (2019–23)
21st-century Finnish women politicians
Women members of the Parliament of Finland